The Peruvian Corporation of Commercial Airports and Aviation Inc. (CORPAC) operates various airports in Peru. It was founded by law (Decreto Legislativo No. 99 - Ley de CORPAC S.A) in June 1943.

See also
 Aeropuertos del Perú
 Lima Airport Partners

References

Airport operators
!CORPAC